Marguerite was a 1,544-ton French ship built by Osbourne, Graham & Co. Ltd. of North Hylton in Sunderland in 1912.

On 28 June 1917 she was sailing from Rouen to Swansea when she was torpedoed and sunk in Lyme Bay by the German submarine  under the command of Oberleutnant zur See Hans Howaldt.

References 

1911 ships
Ships built on the River Wear
Ships sunk by German submarines in World War I
Shipwrecks in the English Channel
Wreck diving sites in the United Kingdom